Mamie Deschillie (1920-2010) was a Navajo folk artist.

Born in either Chaco or Burnham, New Mexico, on the Navajo Nation Reservation, Deschillie lived near Farmington. Described at her death as "a traditional Navajo", she spoke limited English, and frequently wore velvet. Mother of five children, she became an artist after the death of her husband, Chee Ford Deschillie, in 1979. She had little formal education, but in childhood learned to weave, and went on to gain some fame for her weaving before moving into other artistic pursuits. She was known for making mud toys of sun-dried clay, mainly in animal forms such as those of cows, sheep, buffalo, and horses and riders. She would decorate them with fur, cloth, or jewelry before touching them up with paint. In the 1980s she began to make cutouts of cardboard, also decorated with found objects and pieces of jewelry. Her smallest piece was a ten-inch horse and female rider; larger pieces extend up to three feet in height.

Several of Deschillie's works are in the collection of the Smithsonian American Art Museum. Her work is also held by the Museum of Northern Arizona and the Wheelwright Museum of the American Indian.

References

External links
 images of Deschillie's work on Invaluable

1920 births
2010 deaths
Navajo artists
American women sculptors
People from San Juan County, New Mexico
Sculptors from New Mexico
Native American women artists
20th-century American sculptors
20th-century American women artists
20th-century Native Americans
21st-century American sculptors
21st-century American women artists
21st-century Native Americans
20th-century Native American women
21st-century Native American women